Linda Jones (1944–1972) was an American soul singer.

Linda Jones may also refer to:
Linda Bebko-Jones (1946–2011), American politician in Pennsylvania
Linda Jones (greyhound trainer) (born 1948), UK champion greyhound trainer
Linda Medlar-Jones (born 1949), participant in 1990s sex scandal and convicted fraudster
Linda Jones (jockey) (born 1952), New Zealand jockey
Linda Winstead Jones, pen name Linda Jones, American author active since 1999